Style By Jury was an original Canadian makeover show and format which aired on the W Network from 2004 to 2010. The series was created by Carolyn Meland and executive produced and co-developed with partners Romano D'Andrea and Jeff Preyra at Planetworks Inc.

Plot

The premise of the show was centered around first impressions. Candidates were told that they were doing an audition for a makeover, but were unaware that they had been pre-selected for the show. Hidden in the auditioning room behind a two-way mirror, a jury was asked for honest first opinions about the candidate. Once the shock of the two way mirror is revealed, the jury's first impression would be played back on a monitor, and the candidate would often be brought to tears. This set the launchpad for the makeover journey, tackling both the exterior and interior transformation.  At the end of an intensive one week makeover, the candidate returned before an entirely different jury, which was unaware that the subject has had a makeover. What kind of first impression will they make the second time around? Waiting in the wings is one last surprise "special" juror.

The Makeover
The candidates would undergo a top to toe overhaul, typically including extensive cosmetic dentistry,  dermatology, hair, make-up, and fashion. The cornerstone of the makeover, however, would be presented as the internal transformation and coaching which together enabled the candidate to view themselves in a whole new light.

Cast
Recurring principals on the show included:

Host:  Bruce Turner
Wardrobe Consultant: David Clemmer
Cosmetic Dermatologists: Dr. Kucy Pon and Dr. Fred Weksberg
Lasik Eye Surgeons: Dr. Raymond M. Stein and Dr. Sheldon Herzig
Cosmetic Surgeon: Dr. William Middleton
Hair Stylists: Francesco Fontana and Johnny Cupello
Make-up artist:  Korby Banner
Cosmetic Dentistry: Dr. Armaghan Afsar and Dr. Andrew Charkiw
Bombshell Coach: Jacqueline Bradley

International distribution
The series was first distributed by Picture Box's Kate Sanagan and Marily Kynaston and has aired on WE and in Singapore on MediaCorp Channel 5 since 2009, in the Netherlands RTL8, on Bulgarian and Serbian Fox Life, in France on Teva, in Spain on Divinity, and in the United States via syndication (through Program Partners) and Lifetime Real Women through Thunderbird Films.. A Russian version was licensed as well.

In Spain, this TV programme (Tu estilo a juicio) featured on the Divinity channel, which belongs to Mediaset España Comunicación. Mediaset España Comunicación is the largest television network company in Spain.

In 2014, the format rights for the series were acquired by LA production company Electus.

American spinoff
On 13 February 2015, an American version of the series launched on TLC, hosted by Preston Konrad and Louise Roe. It was watched by 1,106,000 U.S. viewers.

References

External links
 Style By Jury

Makeover reality television series
Television series by Corus Entertainment
2004 Canadian television series debuts
2000s Canadian reality television series
W Network original programming